Růžena Šlemrová, née Růžena Machová (10 November 1886 – 24 August 1962) was a Czechoslovak film actress. She appeared in more than 70 films between 1914 and 1956.

Selected filmography

 Two Mothers (1921)
 Affair at the Grand Hotel (1929)
 Anton Spelec, Sharp-Shooter (1932)
 The Undertaker (1932)
 Camel Through the Eye of a Needle (1936)
 The Seamstress (1936)
 Delightful Story (1936)
 Krok do tmy (1937)
 Andula Won (1937)
 Lidé na kře (1937)
 Lawyer Vera (1937)
 Pacientka Dr. Hegla (1940)
 Dívka v modrém (1940)
 The Catacombs (1940)
 Auntie's Fantasies (1941)
 In the Still of the Night (1941)
 I'll Be Right Over (1942)
 Fourteen at the Table (1943)
 The Wedding Ring (1944)
 Spring Song (1944)
 Saturday (1945)

References

External links
 

1886 births
1962 deaths
Czechoslovak actresses
Actors from Plzeň